Sanni Maaria Leinonen (born November 8, 1989 in Siilinjärvi) is a former alpine skier from Finland. She competes for Finland in technical events on the World Cup. She represented Finland at the 2010 Winter Olympics.  Her best result was a 30th place in the giant slalom. Her best result on the World Cup was a 7th-place finish in the slalom at Maribor, Slovenia in 2010.

References

External links
 
 
 
 

1989 births
Living people
Finnish female alpine skiers
Olympic alpine skiers of Finland
Alpine skiers at the 2010 Winter Olympics
People from Siilinjärvi